Michal Švec (born 19 March 1987 in Prague) is a Czech footballer who plays for SK Slavia Prague B. He is a central midfielder. He made his debut for the Czech Republic national team in 2009.

Career
Ahead of the 2019-20 season, Švec returned to SK Slavia Prague to play for the clubs B-team.

Honours
 KNVB Cup: 2009

References

External links
 
 
 ISM profile

1987 births
Living people
Czech footballers
Footballers from Prague
Association football midfielders
Czech Republic youth international footballers
Czech Republic under-21 international footballers
Czech Republic international footballers
SK Slavia Prague players
SC Heerenveen players
Győri ETO FC players
Bohemians 1905 players
Czech First League players
Eredivisie players
Nemzeti Bajnokság I players
Czech expatriate footballers
Expatriate footballers in the Netherlands
Expatriate footballers in Hungary
Czech expatriate sportspeople in the Netherlands
Czech expatriate sportspeople in Hungary
Bohemian Football League players